The Spirit of Christmas 2009 is part of the Spirit of Christmas album series.

Track listing
"Have Yourself A Merry Little Christmas" - Jessica Mauboy
"We Want To Share Christmas With You" - Troy Cassar-Daley
"Little Drummer Boy" - Guy Sebastian
"O Holy Night" - Mark Vincent
"Maybe This Christmas" - Katie Noonan & Tim Freedman
"On Christmas Day" - Tim Rogers And The Temperance Union
"The Christmas Song" - James Morrison & Doug Parkinson
"Silent Night" - Natalie Bassingthwaighte
"Christmas Time" - Kasey Chambers, Poppa Bill And The Little Hillbillies
"Bapa" - Gurrumul Yunupingu
"Once In Royal David's City" - CBD 
"Happy Xmas (War Is Over)" - Wes Carr
"Seasons" - Evermore
"Christmas Chorale" - Australian Girls Choir

See also
 2009 in music

2009 Christmas albums
Christmas albums by Australian artists
The Spirit of Christmas albums
2009 compilation albums